Girlfriends is a 2009 South Korean romantic comedy film starring Kang Hye-jung, Han Chae-young, Huh E-jae and Bae Soo-bin.

It is based on the 2007 chick lit novel of the same title by Lee Hong, which won the 31st Writer of Today Award.

Plot
29-year-old Song-yi (Kang Hye-jung) starts dating her handsome co-worker Jin-ho (Bae Soo-bin). But when she suspects Jin-ho might be cheating on her, she sets out to meet the "other woman," only to learn that he has not one, but two, other "girlfriends": Jin (Han Chae-young), Jin-ho's first love, is a sexy and successful party planner, while Bo-ra (Huh E-jae) is a fearless, young college student. On one hand, Song-yi wants to keep Jin-ho all to herself, but strangely enough, she grows close to the two other women and their similar taste in men becomes the basis of a great friendship and a passionate, incestuous love affair.

Cast
 Kang Hye-jung as Song-yi
 Han Chae-young as Jin
 Huh E-jae as Bo-ra
 Bae Soo-bin as Jin-ho
 Jo Eun-ji as Hyun-joo
 Kim Hye-ok as Mom
 Hong Gyo-jin as Representative Park
 Jung In-hwa as Team leader Jung
 Kim Joon-young as real doctor
 Shin Dae-seung as man at intersection
 Hwang Hyun-seo as woman at intersection
 Kim Bo-min as yoga instructor
 Kim Yong-woon as action man 1
 Han Dae-ryong as action man 2
 Kwak Jin-seok as action man 3
 Choi Gyo-sik as rice store owner
 2NE1 as club party guests (cameo) 
 Oh Dal-su as voice doctor (cameo)
 Choi Song-hyun as Soo-kyung (cameo)
 Lee Ho-seong as Dad (cameo)
 Kim Kwang-kyu as department head (cameo)
 Ji Dae-han as taxi driver (cameo)
 Gong Jung-hwan as Mikael (cameo)
 Hwang Hyeon-hee as Jae-hoon (cameo)
 Son Jeong-min as mistress (cameo)
 Park Sung-woong as Jin's husband (cameo)
 Son Ho-young as club party guest Yoo Myeong-nam (cameo)

References

External links
  
 
 
 

South Korean romantic comedy films
2009 films
2009 romantic comedy films
2000s Korean-language films
2000s South Korean films